The Isthmian mouse opossum (Marmosa isthmica) is a species of opossum in the family Didelphidae found in Colombia, Ecuador, and Panama.

Foraging along branches and vines for fruit and insects, with the help of a prehensile tail, M. isthmica was formerly considered a subspecies of Robinson's mouse opossum (Marmosa robinsoni) and is supposed to be similar to it in habit, but following Rossi (2005) it is now deemed a species.

In 1935 in the Panama Canal Zone, Enders observed Marmosa isthmica to build nests with leaves in a nestbox fixed to a tree.

Notes

References
Gardner, A. L. Mammals of South America, Volume 1: Marsupials, Xenarthrans, Shrews, and Bats. University of Chicago Press. 2008. pg. 669 (see p. 59).  

Opossums
Marsupials of Central America
Marsupials of South America
Mammals of Colombia
Mammals of Ecuador
Mammals described in 1912